Otulu may refer to one of a number of populated places in Imo State, Nigeria:

 Otulu, Ahiara
 Otulu, Oru West